The 1994 UK & Ireland Greyhound Racing Year was the 68th year of greyhound racing in the United Kingdom and Ireland.

Roll of honour

Summary
The National Greyhound Racing Club (NGRC) released the annual returns, with totalisator turnover at £87,885,471 and attendances recorded at 3,911,447 from 6393 meetings. 

Westmead Chick trained by Nick Savva was voted Greyhound of the Year after winning the Oaks, Arc, Brighton Belle, Olympic and the Midland Flat. Joyful Tidings was voted Irish Greyhound of the Year after winning the 1994 Irish Greyhound Derby. Tony Meek won a second successive English Greyhound Derby following the victory of Moral Standards.

John McGee won the Greyhound Trainer of the Year for the seventh successive year. McGee was then involved in a major controversy after losing his licence following a positive urine test for a greyhound called Rabatino in the Peterborough Derby final. The NGRC heard the evidence and ruled that he should be suspended for the offence which led to an court battle. A high court judge overturned the NGRC suspension just weeks before he claimed his seventh crown but the NGRC in turn would then fight that ruling imposing the sanction. McGee returned to Ireland to train and would not be seen in NGRC racing again for four years.

Tracks
Cradley Heath closed. 

Brent Walker completed the sale of Hackney Wick Stadium to Fleetfoot Racing.

News
The Greyhound Racing Association (GRA) allowed Slippy Corner to participate in the Laurels, which signalled the end of their policy on disqualification and brought them in line with NGRC rules. Previously any greyhound disqualified was not allowed to compete on a GRA track, whereas under NGRC rules you were allowed a second chance.

BAGS racing continued to grow with fixtures increasing and the betting shop service offering racing all day long. Walthamstow earned their first BAGS contract. Kevin Wilde replaced the GRA's Jarvis Astaire on the NGRC promoters association.

John Coleman sealed the trainer's championship at Walthamstow and Linda Jones made a breakthrough after gaining a contract at Romford.

Trevor Cobbold son of Joe Cobbold was diagnosed with cancer however continued to send out British bred winners. He died before the end of the year and left a legacy of 98 British bred winners in the year, the best return for many years. His wife Pam Cobbold took over the Utopia kennels. Australian born Frightful Flash began stud duties after leaving his quarantine kennels in Somerset on 16 February, his keeper Michael Dunne experienced significant success following the decision to bring the greyhound to the UK and Ireland from Australia.

Competitions
In the final of the Scottish Greyhound Derby at Shawfield Stadium the Irish trained Droopys Sandy broke the track record and propelled him to ante post favouritism for the English Derby but the black dog missed the event. Oaks champion Pearls Girl claimed the Gold Collar at Catford Stadium before Redwood Girl successfully defended her Grand Prix title at Walthamstow Stadium. 

Another bitch, Decoy Lynx was a surprise loser at the Cesarewitch at Belle Vue Stadium to 10-1 shot Sandollar Louie, a 5½ length first round win followed by a one length second round and 6 ½ length semi-final success sent the bitch off at a price of 1-7 but was beaten by a neck. Roger Waters', of the rock group Pink Floyd, greyhound Deenside Dean won the Ike Morris Laurels at Wimbledon Stadium a year after another one of his hounds Farmer Patrick lost in the Laurels final the previous year. Derby finalist Moaning Lad was knocked over in the Laurels final.

Principal UK races

+Track record

Totalisator returns

The totalisator returns declared to the National Greyhound Racing Club for the year 1994 are listed below.

References 

Greyhound racing in the United Kingdom
Greyhound racing in the Republic of Ireland
UK and Ireland Greyhound Racing Year
UK and Ireland Greyhound Racing Year
UK and Ireland Greyhound Racing Year
UK and Ireland Greyhound Racing Year